Óscar Añez Urachianta (born 23 July 1990) is a Bolivian international footballer who plays for Club Always Ready, as a defender.

Career
Born in Santa Cruz de la Sierra, Añez has played club football for Club Universitario since 2009. In June 2013 he signed a two-year contract with Blooming, team which he confessed his preference.

Añez made his international debut for Bolivia in 2012.

References

External links

1990 births
Living people
Sportspeople from Santa Cruz de la Sierra
Association football defenders
Bolivian footballers
Bolivia international footballers
Club Blooming players
Universitario de Sucre footballers
Guabirá players
Club Always Ready players